The 2020–21 Vijay Hazare Trophy was the 19th season of the Vijay Hazare Trophy, a List A cricket tournament in India. It was contested by 38 teams, divided into six groups, with six teams in Group B. Andhra Pradesh, Jharkhand, Madhya Pradesh, Punjab, Tamil Nadu and Vidarbha were placed in Group B, with all the matches taking place in Indore.

On the opening day of the tournament, Jharkhand made the highest total in the Vijay Hazare Trophy. However, this was beaten five days later, when Mumbai made 457/4 against Puducherry. Andhra Pradesh won Group B to qualify for the knockout stage of the tournament.

Points table

Fixtures

Round 1

Round 2

Round 3

Round 4

Round 5

References

Vijay Hazare Trophy
Vijay Hazare Trophy